A carbon tax is a tax levied on the carbon emissions required to produce goods and services. Carbon taxes are intended to make visible the "hidden" social costs of carbon emissions, which are otherwise felt only in indirect ways like more severe weather events. In this way, they are designed to reduce carbon dioxide emissions by increasing prices of the fossil fuels that emit them when burned. This both decreases demand for goods and services that produce high emissions and incentivizes making them less carbon-intensive. In its simplest form, a carbon tax covers only CO2 emissions; however, it could also cover other greenhouse gases, such as methane or nitrous oxide, by taxing such emissions based on their CO2-equivalent global warming potential. Greenhouse gas emissions cause climate change, which damages the environment and human health. This negative externality can be reduced by taxing carbon content at any point in the product cycle. Carbon taxes are thus a type of Pigovian tax.

Research shows that carbon taxes effectively reduce emissions. Many economists argue that carbon taxes are the most efficient (lowest cost) way to tackle climate change. Seventy-seven countries and over 100 cities have committed to achieving net zero emissions by 2050. , carbon taxes have been implemented or scheduled for implementation in 25 countries, while 46 countries put some form of price on carbon, either through carbon taxes or emissions trading schemes.

On their own, carbon taxes are usually regressive, since lower-income households tend to spend a greater proportion of their income on emissions-heavy goods and services like transportation than higher-income households. To make them more progressive, policymakers can try to redistribute the revenue generated from carbon taxes to low-income groups by lowering income taxes or offering rebates, then as part of the politics of climate change the overall policy initiative can be referred to as a carbon fee and dividend, rather than a tax.

Background 
Carbon dioxide is one of several heat-trapping greenhouse gases (others include methane and water vapor) emitted as a result of human activities. The scientific consensus is that human-induced greenhouse gas emissions are the primary cause of global warming, and that carbon dioxide is the most important of the anthropogenic greenhouse gases. Worldwide, 27 billion tonnes of carbon dioxide are produced by human activity annually.

David Gordon Wilson first proposed a carbon tax in 1973. A series of treaties and other agreements have focused attention on climate change. In the 2015 Paris Agreement, countries committed to reducing their greenhouse gas emissions over the ensuing decades.

Different greenhouse gases have different physical properties: the global warming potential is an internationally accepted scale of equivalence for other greenhouse gases in units of tonnes of carbon dioxide equivalent.

Economic theory 

A carbon tax is a form of pollution tax. Unlike classic command and control regulations, which explicitly limit or prohibit emissions by each individual polluter, a carbon tax aims to allow market forces to determine the most efficient way to reduce pollution. A carbon tax is an indirect tax—a tax on a transaction—as opposed to a direct tax, which taxes income. Carbon taxes are price instruments since they set a price rather than an emission limit. In addition to creating incentives for energy conservation, a carbon tax puts renewable energy such as wind, solar and geothermal on a more competitive footing.

In economic theory, pollution is considered a negative externality, a negative effect on a third party not directly involved in a transaction, and is a type of market failure. To confront the issue, economist Arthur Pigou proposed taxing the goods (in this case hydrocarbon fuels), that were the source of the externality so as to accurately reflect the cost of the goods to society, thereby internalizing the production costs. A tax on a negative externality is called a Pigovian tax, which should equal the cost.

Within Pigou's framework, the changes involved are marginal, and the size of the externality is assumed to be small enough not to distort the economy. Climate change is claimed to result in catastrophe (non-marginal) changes. "Non-marginal" means that the impact could significantly reduce the growth rate in income and welfare. The amount of resources that should be devoted to climate change mitigation is controversial. Policies designed to reduce carbon emissions could have a non-marginal impact, but are asserted to not be catastrophic.

Two common economic alternatives to carbon taxes are tradable permits/credits and subsidies.

Carbon leakage 

Carbon leakage happens when the regulation of emissions in one country/sector pushes those emissions to other places that with less regulation. Leakage effects can be both negative (i.e., increasing the effectiveness of reducing overall emissions) and positive (reducing the effectiveness of reducing overall emissions). Negative leakages, which are desirable, can be referred to as "spill-over".

According to one study, short-term leakage effects need to be judged against long-term effects. A policy that, for example, establishes carbon taxes only in developed countries might leak emissions to developing countries. However, a desirable negative leakage could occur due to reduced demand for coal, oil, and gas in developed countries, lowering prices. This could allow developing countries to substitute oil or gas for coal, lowering emissions. In the long-run, however, if less polluting technologies are delayed, this substitution might have no long-term benefit.

Carbon leakage is central to climate policy, given the 2030 Energy and Climate Framework and the review of the European Union's third carbon leakage list.

Border adjustments, tariffs and bans 
Policies have been suggested to address concerns over competitive losses experienced by countries that introduce a carbon tax versus countries that do not. Border tax adjustments, tariffs and trade bans have been proposed to encourage countries to introduce carbon taxes.

Border tax adjustments compensate for emissions attributable to imports from nations without a carbon price. An alternative would be trade bans or tariffs applied to such countries. Such approaches could be inadmissible at the World Trade Organization. Case law there has not provided specific rulings on climate-related taxes. The administrative aspects of border tax adjustments have been discussed.

Other types of taxes 

Two related taxes are emissions taxes and energy taxes. An emissions tax on greenhouse gas emissions requires individual emitters to pay a fee, charge, or tax for every tonne of greenhouse gas, while an energy tax is applied to the fuels themselves.

In terms of climate change mitigation, a carbon tax is not a perfect substitute for an emissions tax. For example, a carbon tax encourages reduced fuel use, but it does not encourage emissions reduction such as carbon capture and storage.

Energy taxes increase the price of energy regardless of emissions. An ad valorem energy tax is levied according to the energy content of a fuel or the value of an energy product, which may or may not be consistent with the emitted greenhouse gas amounts and their respective global warming potentials. Studies indicate that to reduce emissions by a certain amount, ad valorem energy taxes would be more costly than carbon taxes. However, although greenhouse gas emissions are an externality, using energy services may result in other negative externalities, e.g., air pollution not covered by the carbon tax (such as ammonia or fine particles). A combined carbon-energy tax may therefore be better at reducing air pollution than a carbon tax alone.

Any of these taxes can be combined with a rebate, where the money collected by the tax is returned to qualifying parties, taxing heavy emitters and subsidizing those that emit less carbon.

Embodied carbon and architecture 
Embodied carbon emissions, or upfront carbon emissions (UCE), are the result of creating and maintaining the materials that form a building. As of 2018, "Embodied carbon is responsible 11% of global greenhouse gas emissions and 28% of global building sector emissions ... Embodied carbon will be responsible for almost half of total new construction emissions between now and 2050."

Steve Webb, co-founder of Webb Yates Engineers, has suggested that buildings with "high carbon frames should be taxed like cigarettes," to create a presumption in favour of timber, stone, and other zero-carbon architectural design techniques."

Other reduction strategies

Carpooling 
Fuel taxes and carbon taxes encourage carpooling. Carpools offer the added benefits of helping to reduce commute time, reduce car accident rates, increase personal savings, and improve quality of life. Drawbacks include the cost of enforcement, increased police stops, and political resistance from increased government involvement in daily life.

Petroleum (gasoline, diesel, jet fuel) taxes 
Many countries tax fuel directly; for example, the UK imposes a hydrocarbon oil duty directly on vehicle hydrocarbon oils, including petrol and diesel fuel.

While a direct tax sends a clear signal to the consumer, its efficiency at influencing consumers' fuel use has been challenged for reasons including:
 Possible delays of a decade or more as inefficient vehicles are replaced by newer models and the older models filter through the fleet.
 Political pressures that deter policymakers from increasing taxes.
 Limited relationship between consumer decisions on fuel economy and fuel prices. Other efforts, such as fuel efficiency standards, or changing income tax rules on taxable benefits, may be more effective.
 The historical use of fuel taxes as a source of general revenue, given fuel's low price elasticity, which allows higher rates without reducing fuel volumes. In these circumstances, the policy rational may be unclear.

Vehicle fuel taxes may reduce the "rebound effect" that occurs when vehicle efficiency improves. Consumers may make additional journeys or purchase heavier and more powerful vehicles, offsetting the efficiency gains.

Design 
The design of a carbon tax involves two primary factors: the level of the tax, and the use of the revenue. The former is based on the social cost of carbon (SCC), which attempts to calculate the numeric cost of the externalities of carbon pollution. The precise number is the subject of debate in environmental and policy circles. A higher SCC corresponds with a higher evaluation of the costs of carbon pollution on society. Stanford University scientists have estimated the social cost of carbon to be upwards of $200 per ton. More conservative estimates pin the cost at around $50.

The use of the revenue is another subject of debate in carbon tax proposals. A government may use revenue to increase its discretionary spending, or address deficits. However, such proposals often run the risk of being regressive, and sparking backlash among the public due to an increased cost of energy associated with such taxes. To avoid this and increase the popularity of a carbon tax, a government may make the carbon tax revenue-neutral. This can be done by reducing income tax proportionate to the level of the carbon tax, or by returning carbon tax revenues to citizens as a dividend.

Impact 
Research shows that carbon taxes effectively reduce greenhouse gas emissions. Most economists assert that carbon taxes are the most efficient and effective way to curb climate change, with the least adverse economic effects.

Carbon taxes can increase electricity prices.

One study found that Sweden's carbon tax successfully reduced carbon dioxide emissions from transport by 11%. A 2015 British Columbia study found that the taxes reduced greenhouse gas emissions by 5–15% while having negligible overall economic effects. A 2017 British Columbia study found that industries on the whole benefited from the tax and "small but statistically significant 0.74 percent annual increases in employment" but that carbon-intensive and trade-sensitive industries were adversely affected. A 2020 study of carbon taxes in wealthy democracies showed that carbon taxes had not limited economic growth.

A number of studies have found that in the absence of an increase in social benefits and tax credits, a carbon tax would hit poor households harder than rich households. Gilbert E. Metcalf disputed that carbon taxes would be regressive in the US.

Implementation by country 

Both energy and carbon taxes have been implemented in response to commitments under the United Nations Framework Convention on Climate Change. In most cases the tax is implemented in combination with exemptions.

South Africa
South Africa Finance Minister Pravin Gordhan first announced a carbon tax in 2010 that was to begin in 2015. After numerous delays, the tax was finally passed in 2019 and is due to come into effect in 2022. The National Treasury has proposed to increase the carbon tax rate by a minimum of US$1 from 2023 to 2025 with gradual increment to US$20 (~R350) by 2026 and to US$30 (~R530) by 2030.

Zimbabwe 
Although a tax the Zimbabwean government calls "carbon tax" exists, it only taxes certain imported fuels and more closely resembles a tariff or fuel tax.

China 
The Chinese Ministry of Finance originally proposed a carbon tax in 2010, to come into effect in 2012 or 2013. The tax was never passed; in February 2021 the government instead set up a carbon trading scheme.

Indonesia 
Carbon tax provisions are regulated in Article 13 of the Law 7/2021 in which carbon tax will be imposed on entities producing carbon emissions that have a negative impact on the environment. Based on the Law 7/2021, the imposition of carbon tax will be carried out by focusing on two specific schemes i.e., the carbon tax scheme (cap and tax) and the carbon trade scheme (cap and trade).

In the carbon trade scheme, individual or company ("entities") that produce emissions exceeding the cap are required to purchase for an emission permit certificate ("Sertifikat Izin Emisi"/SIE) from other entities that produce emissions below the cap.

In addition, entities can also purchase emission reduction certificates ("Sertifikat Penurunan Emisi"/SPE). However, if the entity is unable to purchase SIE or SPE in full for the resulting emissions, the cap and tax scheme will apply where entities producing residual emissions that exceed the cap will be subject to carbon tax.

India 
India does not tax carbon emissions directly, but since 2010 the country has had a tax on both domestically produced and imported coal, which powers more than half of its electricity generation.

Japan 
In addition, Tokyo has had a local carbon emissions trading system since 2010 in which carbon permits are valued at approximately US$50.

In December 2009, nine industry groupings opposed a carbon tax at the opening day of the COP-15 Copenhagen climate conference stating, "Japan should not consider a carbon tax as it would damage the economy which is already among the world's most energy-efficient." The industry groupings represented the oil, cement, paper, chemical, gas, electric power, auto manufacturing and electronics, and information technology sectors.

Singapore 
On 20 February 2017, Singapore proposed a carbon tax. The Carbon Pricing Act was passed on 20 March 2018 and came into force on 1 January 2019.

Taiwan 
Taiwan does not currently have any form of carbon tax. As a result, vice finance minister Chang Sheng-ho announced a plan for a carbon tax in starting 2011, with the revenues funding low-income families and public transport. However, Premier Wu Den-yih opposed implementing the tax, arguing it would increase public suffering during the then ongoing recession. The carbon tax was never implemented.

As opposed to the commonly adopted carbon tax, Taiwan's Climate Change Response Act has proposed implementation of a carbon fee. This would require local companies emitting more than 25,000 tonnes of carbon per year to pay a fee. The carbon fee would come into effect from 2024 or 2025 and would start with large emitters, while other carbon emitting groups would be added subsequently after the initial law is passed.

Australia 

To offset the tax, the government reduced income tax (by increasing the tax-free threshold) and increased pensions and welfare payments slightly, while introducing compensation for some affected industries. On 17 July 2014, a report by the Australian National University estimated that the Australian scheme had cut carbon emissions by as much as 17 million tonnes. The tax notably helped reduce pollution from the electricity sector.

On 17 July 2014, the Abbott Government passed repeal legislation through the Senate, and Australia became the first nation to abolish a carbon tax. In its place, the government set up the Emission Reduction Fund.

New Zealand 

New Zealand does not have a carbon tax. Instead, the country prices carbon via the New Zealand Emissions Trading Scheme, which was enacted by the Climate Change Response (Emissions Trading) Amendment Act 2008.

In 2005, the Fifth Labour Government had proposed a carbon tax of NZ$15 per tonne of CO2 equivalent (US$14.47 after adjusting for inflation in 2021) to meet obligations under the Kyoto Protocol. The tax was scheduled to take effect from April 2007 and apply across most economic sectors, with an exemption for methane emissions from farming and provisions for special exemptions from carbon-intensive businesses if they adopted best-practice standards. After the 2005 election, some of the minor parties supporting the Fifth Labour Government (NZ First and United Future) opposed the proposed tax, and it was abandoned in December 2005.

European Union 

In Europe, many countries have imposed energy taxes or energy taxes based partly on carbon content. These include Denmark, Finland, Germany, Ireland, Italy, the Netherlands, Norway, Slovenia, Sweden, Switzerland, and the UK. None of these countries has been able to introduce a uniform carbon tax for fuels in all sectors.

During the 1990s, a carbon/energy tax was proposed at the EU level but failed due to industrial lobbying. In 2010, the European Commission considered implementing a pan-European minimum tax on pollution permits purchased under the European Union Greenhouse Gas Emissions Trading Scheme (EU ETS) in which the proposed new tax would be calculated in terms of carbon content. The suggested rate of €4 to €30 per tonne of CO2.

Denmark 
The tax applies to all energy users. Industrial companies can be taxed differently according to the process the energy is used for, and whether or not the company has entered into a voluntary agreement to apply energy efficiency measures.

However, Denmark offers a tax refund for energy efficient changes. Most of the money collected would be put into research for alternative energy resources.

This is the highest carbon tax in Europe.

Finland 
Finland was the first country in the 1990s to introduce a CO2 tax, initially with exemptions for specific fuels or sectors. Energy taxation was changed many times. These changes were related to the opening of the Nordic electricity market. Other Nordic countries exempted energy-intensive industries, and Finnish industries felt disadvantaged by this. Finland placed a border tax on imported electricity, but this was found to be out of line with EU single market legislation. Changes were then made to the carbon tax to partially exclude energy-intensive firms. This had the effect of increasing the costs of reducing CO2 emissions.

Vourc'h and Jimenez proposed that arguments based on competitive losses be viewed with caution. For example, they suggested that carbon tax revenues could be used to reduce labour taxes, which would favour non-energy-intensive industries.

France 
In 2009, France detailed a carbon tax with a levy on oil, gas, and coal consumption by households and businesses that was supposed to come into effect on 1 January 2010. The tax would affect households and businesses, which would have raised the cost of a litre of unleaded fuel by about four euro cents (25 US cents per gallon). The total estimated income from the carbon tax would have been between €3–4.5 billion annually, with 55 percent from households and 45 percent from businesses. The tax would not have applied to electricity, which in France comes mostly from nuclear power.

On 30 December 2009, the bill was blocked by the French Constitutional Council, which said it included too many exceptions. Among those exceptions, certain industries were excluded that would have made the taxes unequal and inefficient. They included exemptions for agriculture, fishing, trucking, and farming. French President Nicolas Sarkozy, although he vowed to "lead the fight to save the human race from global warming", was forced to back down after mass social protests led to strikes. He wanted support from the rest of the European Union before proceeding.

In 2014, a carbon tax was implemented. Prime Minister Jean-Marc Ayrault announced the new Climate Energy Contribution (CEC) on 21 September 2013. The tax would apply at a rate of €7/tonne  in 2014, €14.50 in 2015 and rising to €22 in 2016. As of 2018, the carbon tax was at €44.60/tonne. and was due to increase every year to reach €65.40/tonne in 2020 and €86.20/tonne in 2022.

After weeks of protests by the "Gilets Jaunes" (yellow vests) against the rise of gas prices, French President Emmanuel Macron announced on 4 December 2018, the tax would not be increased in 2019 as planned.

Germany 
The German ecological tax reform was adopted in 1999. After that, the law was amended in 2000 and in 2003. The law grew taxes on fuel and fossil fuels and laid the foundation for the tax for energy. The law came into effect in January 2021. The tax will increase to 55 Euros per tonne by 2025. From 2026 onwards, the price will be decided at auction.

Netherlands 
The Netherlands initiated a carbon tax in 1990. However, in 1992, it was replaced with a 50/50 carbon/energy tax called the Environmental Tax on Fuels. The taxes are assessed partly on carbon content and partly on energy content. The charge was transformed into a tax and became part of general tax revenues. The general fuel tax is collected on all hydrocarbon fuels. Fuels used as raw materials are not subject to the tax.

In 1996, the Regulatory Tax on Energy, another 50/50 carbon/energy tax, was implemented. The environmental tax and the regulatory tax are 5.16 Dutch guilder, or NLG (~$3.13), or per tonne of CO2 and 27.00 NLG (~$16.40) per tonne CO2 respectively. Under the general fuel tax, electricity is not taxed, though fuels used to produce electricity are taxable. Energy-intensive industries initially benefited from preferential rates under this tax, but the benefit was canceled in January 1997. Since 1997, nuclear power has been taxed under the general fuel tax at the rate of NLG 31.95 per gram of uranium-235.38

In 2007, the Netherlands introduced a Waste Fund that is funded by a carbon-based packaging tax. This tax was both used to finance government spending and to finance activities to help reach the goals of recycling 65% of used packaging by 2012. The organization Nedvang (Nederland van afval naar grondstof or The Netherlands from waste to value) was set up in 2005. It supports producers and importers of packaged goods. This decree was signed in 2005 and states that producers and importers of packaged goods are responsible for the collection and recycling of related waste and that at least 65% of that waste has to be recycled. Producers and importers can choose to reach the goals on an individual basis or by joining an organization like Nedvang.

The Carbon-Based Tax on Packaging was found to be ineffective by the Ministry of Infrastructure and the Environment. It was therefore abolished. Producer responsibility activities for packaging are now financed based on legally binding contracts.

Norway 
Norway introduced a CO2 tax on fuels in 1991. The tax applied to diesel, mineral oil, oil and gas used in North Sea extraction activities. The International Energy Agency's (IEA) in 2001 stated that "since 1991 a carbon dioxide tax has applied in addition to excise taxes on fuel." It is among the highest rates in OECD. The applies to offshore oil and gas production.

According to IEA's 2005 Review, Norway's CO2 tax is its most important climate policy instrument, and covers about 64% of Norwegian CO2 emissions and 52% of total greenhouse gas emissions. Some industry sectors were exempted to preserve their competitive position. Various studies in the 1990s, and an economic analysis by Statistics Norway, estimated the effect to be a reduction of 2.5–11% of Norwegian emissions compared to (untaxed) business-as-usual. However, Norway's per capita emissions still rose by 15% as of 2008.

In attempt to reduce  emissions by a larger amount, Norway implemented an Emissions Trading Scheme in 2005 and joined the European Union Emissions Trading Scheme (EU ETS) in 2008. As of 2013, roughly 55% of  emissions in Norway were taxed and exempt emissions are included in the EU ETS. Certain  taxes are applied to emissions that result from petroleum activities on the continental shelf. This tax is charged per liter of oil and natural gas liquids produced, as well as per standard cubic meter of gas flared or otherwise emitted. However, this carbon tax is a tax deductible operating cost for petroleum production. In 2013, carbon tax rates were doubled to 0.96 NOK per liter/standard cubic meter of mineral oil and natural gas. As of 2016, the rate increased to 1,02 NOK. The Norwegian Ministry of the Environment described  taxes as the most important tool for reducing emissions.

Ireland 
In 2004, following a policy review, the Irish Government rejected a carbon tax option. In 2007 a Fianna Fáil-Green Party coalition government was formed, and promised to reconsider the matter. In 2010 the country's carbon tax was introduced at €15 per tonne of CO2 emissions (approx. US$20 per tonne).

The tax applies to kerosene, marked gas oil, liquid petroleum gas, fuel oil, and natural gas. The tax does not apply to electricity because the cost of electricity is already included in pricing under the Single Electricity Market (SEM). Similarly, natural gas users are exempt if they can prove they are using the gas to "generate electricity, for chemical reduction, or for electrolytic or metallurgical processes". Partial relief is granted for natural gas covered by a greenhouse gas emissions permit issued by the Environmental Protection Agency. Such gas will be taxed at the minimum rate specified in the EU Energy Tax Directive, which is €0.54 per megawatt-hour at gross calorific value." Pure biofuels are also exempt. The Economic and Social Research Institute (ESRI) estimated costs between €2 and €3 a week per household: a survey from the Central Statistics Office reports that Ireland's average disposable income was almost €48,000 in 2007.

Activist group Active Retirement Ireland proposed a pensioner's allowance of €4 per week for the 30 weeks currently covered by the fuel allowance and that home heating oil be covered under the Household Benefit Package.

The tax is paid by companies. Payment for the first accounting period was due in July 2010. Fraudulent violation is punishable by jail or a fine.

The NGO Irish Rural Link noted that according to ESRI a carbon tax would weigh more heavily on rural households. They claim that other countries have shown that carbon taxation succeeds only if it is part of a comprehensive package that includes reducing other taxes.

Carbon Tax was introduced in Ireland in the 2010 budget by the Green Party/Fianna Fáil coalition government at a rate of €15/tonne . It was applied to motor gasoline and diesel and to home heating oil (diesel).

In 2011, the coalition government of Fine Gael and Labour raised the tax to €20/tonne. Farmers were granted tax relief.

Sweden 
In January 1991, Sweden enacted a CO2 tax of SEK 250 per 1000 kg ($40 at the time, or EUR 27 at current rates) on the use of oil, coal, natural gas, liquefied petroleum gas, petrol, and aviation fuel used in domestic travel. Industrial users paid half the rate (between 1993 and 1997, 25%), and preferred industries such as commercial horticulture, mining, manufacturing, and pulp and paper were exempted entirely. As a result, the tax only covers around 40% of Sweden's carbon emissions. The rate was raised to SEK 365 ($60) in 1997 and SEK 930 in 2007.

According to a 2019 study, the tax was instrumental in substantially reducing Sweden's carbon dioxide emissions. The tax is also credited by Swedish Society for Nature Conservation climate change expert Emma Lindberg and University of Lund Professor Thomas Johansson with spurring a significant move from hydrocarbon fuels to biomass. Lindberg said, "It was the one major reason that steered society towards climate-friendly solutions. It made polluting more expensive and focused people on finding energy-efficient solutions."

Switzerland 
In January 2008, Switzerland implemented a  incentive tax on all hydrocarbon fuels, unless are used for energy. Gasoline and diesel fuels are not affected. It is an incentive tax because it is designed to promote the economic use of hydrocarbon fuels. Switzerland prefers to rely on voluntary actions and measures to reduce emissions. The law mandated a CO2 tax if voluntary measures proved to be insufficient. In 2005, the federal government decided that additional measures were needed to meet Kyoto Protocol commitments of an 8% reduction in emissions below 1990 levels between 2008 and 2012. In 2007, the  tax was approved by the Swiss Federal Council, coming into effect in 2008.

Companies are allowed to escape the tax by participating in emissions trading where they voluntarily commit to legally binding reduction targets. Emission allowances are given to companies for free, and each year emission allowances equal to the amount of additional CO2 emitted must be surrendered by the company. Companies are allowed to sell or trade excess permits. However, a company that fails to surrender sufficient allowances must pay the tax retroactively for each tonne emitted since the exemption was granted. As of 2009 some 400 companies operated under this program. In 2008 and 2009 the companies returned enough credits to the Swiss government to cover their CO2 emissions. Switzerland issued so many allowances that few emissions permits were traded.

The tax is revenue-neutral because revenues are redistributed to companies and to the Swiss population. For example, if the population bears 60% of the tax burden, it receives 60% of the rebate. Revenues are redistributed to all payers, except those who exempt themselves from the tax through the cap-and-trade program. The revenue is given to companies in proportion to payroll. Tax revenues that were paid by the population are redistributed equally to all residents. In June 2009, the Swiss Parliament allocated about one-third of the carbon tax revenue to a 10-year construction initiative. This program promotes building renovations, renewable energies, waste heat reruse, and building engineering.

Tax revenue from 2008 to 2010 were distributed in 2010. In 2008, the tax raised around CHF 220 million in revenue. As of 16 June 2010, a total of around  had become available for distribution. IEA commended Switzerland's tax for its design and that tax revenues would be recycled as "sound fiscal practice".

However, this surcharge was supplemented with a CO2 tax on transport fuels if emissions reductions are not satisfactory. In their 2007 review, IEA recommended that Switzerland implement a CO2 tax on transport fuels or increase the Climate Cent surcharge to better balance the costs of meeting emissions reductions targets across sectors.

United Kingdom 
The United Kingdom currently does not have a carbon tax. Instead, various fuel taxes and energy taxes have been implemented over the years, such as the fuel duty escalator (1993) and the Climate Change Levy (2001). The UK was also a member of the European Union Emission Trading Scheme until it left the EU. It has since implemented its own carbon trading scheme.

Costa Rica 
In 1997, Costa Rica imposed a 3.5 percent carbon tax on hydrocarbon fuels. A portion of the proceeds go to the "Payment for Environmental Services" (PSA) program which gives incentives to property owners to practice sustainable development and forest conservation. Approximately 11% of Costa Rica's national territory is protected by the plan. The program now pays out roughly $15 million a year to around 8,000 property owners.

Canada 

In the 2008 Canadian federal election, a carbon tax proposed by Liberal Party leader Stéphane Dion, known as the Green Shift, became a central issue. It would have been revenue-neutral, balancing increased taxation on carbon with rebates. However, it proved to be unpopular and contributed to the Liberal Party's defeat, earning the lowest vote share since Confederation. The Conservative party won the election by promising to "develop and implement a North American-wide cap-and-trade system for greenhouse gases and air pollution, with implementation to occur between 2012 and 2015".

In 2018, Canada enacted a revenue-neutral carbon levy starting in 2019, fulfilling Prime Minister Justin Trudeau's campaign pledge. The Greenhouse Gas Pollution Pricing Act applies only to provinces without provincial adequate carbon pricing.

As of September 2020, seven of thirteen Canadian provinces and territories use the federal carbon tax while three have developed their own carbon tax programs.

Quebec 

Quebec became the first province to introduce a carbon tax. The tax was to be imposed on energy producers starting 1 October 2007, with revenue collected used for energy-efficiency programs.

British Columbia 

On 19 February 2008, British Columbia announced its intention to implement a carbon tax of $10 per tonne of carbon dioxide equivalent (CO2e) emissions (2.41 cents per litre on gasoline) beginning 1 July 2008, the first North American jurisdiction to implement such a tax. The tax was to increase until 2012, reaching a final price of $30 per tonne (7.2 cents per litre at the pumps). The tax was to be revenue neutral by reducing corporate and income taxes accordingly. The government was to reduce other taxes by $481 million over three years. In January 2010, the carbon tax was applied to biodiesel. Before the tax went into effect, the government of British Columbia sent out "rebate cheques" from expected revenues to all residents. In January 2013, the tax was collecting about $1 billion/year, which was rebated.

The tax was based on the following principles:
 All revenue is recycled through tax reductions – The government was required to demonstrate how all carbon tax revenue was to be returned to taxpayers through tax reductions.
 The tax rate increased gradually – to give individuals and businesses time to make adjustments and respect decisions made prior to the announcement of the tax.
 Protect Low-income individuals and families – A refundable Low Income Climate Action Tax Credit helps offset the tax paid by low-income individuals and families.
 Broad base – Virtually all emissions from fuel combustion are taxed, with no exemptions except those required for integration with other climate actions.
 The tax would not, on its own, meet B.C.'s emission-reduction targets.

Many Canadians concluded that the carbon tax generally benefitted the British Columbian economy, in large part because its revenue neutral feature reduced personal income taxes. However some industries complained loudly that the tax had harmed them, notably cement manufacturers and farmers. Nevertheless, the tax attracted attention in the United States and elsewhere from those seeking an economically efficient way of reducing the emission of greenhouse gases without hurting economic growth.

Alberta 
In July 2007, Alberta enacted the Specified Gas Emitters Regulation, Alta. Reg. 139/2007, (SGER). This tax exacts a $15/tonne contribution by companies that emit more than 100,000 tonnes of greenhouse gas annually that do not reduce their CO2 emissions per barrel by 12 percent, or buy an offset. In January 2016, the contribution required by large emitters increased to $20/tonne. The tax fell heavily on oil companies and coal-fired electricity plants. It was intended to encourage companies to lower emissions while fostering new technology. The plan only covered the largest emitters, who produced 70% of Alberta's emissions. Critics charged that the smallest energy producers are often the most casual about emissions and pollution. The carbon tax is currently $20 per tonne. Because Alberta's economy is dependent on oil extraction, the majority of Albertans opposed a nationwide carbon tax. Alberta also opposed a national cap and trade system. The local tax retains the proceeds within Alberta.

On 23 November 2015, the Alberta government announced a carbon tax scheme similar to British Columbia's in that it would apply to the entire economy. All businesses and residents paid tax based upon equivalent emissions, including the burning of wood and biofuels. The tax came into force in 2017 at $20 per tonne.

On 4 June 2019 a carbon tax repeal bill was enacted.

United States 

A national carbon tax in the U.S. has been repeatedly proposed, but never enacted. For instance, on 23 July 2018, Representative Carlos Curbelo (R-FL) introduced H.R. 6463, the "MARKET CHOICE Act", a proposal for a carbon tax in which revenue is used to bolster American infrastructure and environmental solutions. The bill was introduced in the House of Representatives, but did not become law.

A number of organizations are currently advancing national carbon tax proposals. To address concerns from conservatives that a carbon tax would grow government and increase cost of living, recent proposals have centered around revenue-neutrality. The Citizens' Climate Lobby (CCL), republicEn (formerly E&EI), the Climate Leadership Council (CLC), and Americans for Carbon Dividends (AFCD) support a revenue-neutral carbon tax with a border adjustment. The latter two organizations advocate for a specific framework called the Baker-Shultz Carbon Dividends Plan, which has gained national bipartisan traction since its announcement in 2017. The central principle is a gradually rising carbon tax in which all revenues are rebated as equal dividends to the American people. This plan is co-authored by (and named after) Republican elder-statesmen James Baker and George Shultz. It is also supported by companies including Microsoft, Pepsico, First Solar, American Wind Energy Association, Exxon Mobil, BP, and General Motors.

California
In 2006, the state of California passed AB-32 (Global Warming Solutions Act of 2006), which requires California to reduce greenhouse gas emissions. To implement AB-32, the California Air Resources Board proposed a carbon tax but this was not enacted.

In May 2008, the Bay Area Air Quality Management District, which covers nine counties in the San Francisco Bay Area, passed a carbon tax on businesses of 4.4 cents per ton of CO2.

Colorado

In November 2006, voters in Boulder, Colorado, passed what is said to be the first municipal carbon tax. It covers electricity consumption with deductions for using electricity from renewable sources (primarily Xcel's WindSource program). The goal is to reduce their emissions by 7% below 1990 levels by 2012. Tax revenues are collected by Xcel Energy and are directed to the city's Office of Environmental Affairs to fund programs to reduce emissions.

Boulder's Climate Action Plan (CAP) tax was expected to raise $1.6 million in 2010. The tax was increased to a maximum allowable rate by voters in 2009 to meet CAP goals. Tax revenues were expected to decrease over time as conservation and renewable energy expand. The tax was renewed by voters on 6 November 2012.

As of 2015, the Boulder carbon tax was estimated to reduce carbon output by over 100,000 tons per year and provided  in revenue. This revenue is invested in bike lanes, energy-efficient solutions, rebates, and community programs. The surcharge has been generally well received.

Maryland
In May 2010, Montgomery County, Maryland, passed the nation's first county-level carbon tax. The legislation required payments of $5 per ton of CO2 emitted from any stationary source emitting more than a million tons of carbon dioxide per year. The only source of emissions fitting the criteria is an 850 megawatt coal-fired power plant then owned by Mirant Corporation. The law directed half of tax revenues toward low interest loans for county residents to invest in residential energy efficiency. The county's energy supplier buys its energy at auction, requiring the plant owner to sell its energy at market value, preventing any increase in energy costs. In June 2010, Mirant sued the county to stop the tax. In June 2011 the Federal Court of Appeals ruled that the tax was a fee imposed "for regulatory or punitive purposes" rather than a tax, and therefore could be challenged in court. The County Council repealed the fee in July 2012.

Internal price on carbon 
Many corporations calculate an "internal price on carbon". Companies use this internal price to assess the risk of future projects into their investment decisions. Oil company have assets (factories, refineries) with a long lifespan that can be affected by future energy policies.

Support

Economists and climate scientists 
Greg Mankiw, head of the Council of Economic Advisers under the George W. Bush administration, economic adviser to Mitt Romney for his 2012 presidential campaign and economics professor at Harvard University since 1985, has been advocating for increased carbon/oil taxation since at least 1999. 
In 2006, he founded the Pigou Club of economists advocating for Pigovian taxes, a carbon tax among them. The club's manifesto states "[h]igher gasoline taxes, perhaps as part of a broader carbon tax, would be the most direct and least invasive policy to address environmental concerns."

In 1979, economist Milton Friedman expressed support for ecotaxes in general in an interview on The Phil Donahue Show, saying "...the best way to [deal with pollution] is to impose a tax on the cost of the pollutants emitted by a car and make an incentive for car manufacturers and for consumers to keep down the amount of pollution." In Free to Choose (1980), Friedman reiterated his support ecotaxes especially as compared with increased environmental regulation, stating "The preservation of the environment and the avoidance of undue pollution are real problems and they are problems concerning which the government has an important role to play. ... Most economists agree that a far better way to control pollution than the present method of specific regulation and supervision is to introduce market discipline by imposing effluent charges."

In 2001, environmental scientist Lester Brown, founder of the Worldwatch Institute and founder and president of the Earth Policy Institute, outlined a detailed "tax shifting" structure that would not lead to an overall higher tax level: "It means reducing income taxes and offsetting them with taxes on environmentally destructive activities such as carbon emissions, the generation of toxic waste, the use of virgin raw materials, the use of non-refillable beverage containers, mercury emissions, the generation of garbage, the use of pesticides, and the use of throwaway products... activities that should be discouraged by taxing."

Former US Federal Reserve chairman Paul Volcker suggested (6 February 2007) that "it would be wiser to impose a tax on oil, for example, than wait for the market to drive up oil prices. A tax would give the government 'some leverage that you can use for other things., supporting a carbon tax.

NASA climatologist James E. Hansen has argued in support of a carbon tax.

Citizens' Climate Lobby advocates for carbon tax legislation (specifically a progressive fee and dividend model). The organization has about 165 chapters in the United States, Canada, and several other countries including Bangladesh and Sweden.

Monica Prasad, a Northwestern University sociologist, wrote about Denmark's carbon tax in The New York Times in 2008. Prasad argued that a critical component for Denmark's success was that the revenues subsidized firms to switch to renewable energy.

According to economist Laura D'Andrea Tyson, "The beauty of a carbon tax is its market-based simplicity. Economists since Adam Smith have insisted that prices are by far the most efficient way to guide the decisions of producers and consumers. Carbon emissions have an 'unpriced' societal cost in terms of their deleterious effects on the earth's climate. A tax on carbon would reflect these costs and send a powerful price signal that would discourage carbon emissions."

The American Enterprise Institute, Environmental economist Jack Pezzey, economist Jeffrey Sachs (director of the Earth Institute of Columbia University), Yale economist William Nordhaus support carbon taxes.

In January 2019, economists published a statement in the Wall Street Journal calling for a carbon tax, describing it as "the most cost-effective lever to reduce carbon emissions at the scale and speed that is necessary." In October 2021, the statement had been signed by more than 3,600 U.S. economists, including 28 Nobel Laureates.

Others 

 Former US Vice President Al Gore backed a carbon tax in his book, Earth in the Balance. 
 Former Representative Bob Inglis (R-South Carolina) heads the Energy and Enterprise Initiative at George Mason University and supports a carbon tax.
 Carl Pope, former executive director of the Sierra Club, supports a carbon tax over cap-and-trade because employers will know exactly what their emissions cost, and because cap-and-trade (with grandfathered permits) rewards those who have the highest emissions.
 In 2008, Rex Tillerson, then CEO of ExxonMobil, said a carbon tax is "a more direct, more transparent and more effective approach" than a cap and trade program, which he said, "inevitably introduces unnecessary cost and complexity." He said that he hoped that the revenues from a carbon tax would be used to lower other taxes.
 In 2016 in Washington state, the Sierra Club, the Washington Environmental Council, Climate Solutions, and the Alliance for Jobs and Clean Energy opposed a proposed tax of $25 per tonne on fossil fuels arguing that the enactment would undermine state finances. In 2018, they instead supported a $15 per tonne tax in that state, along with many other environmental groups, in part because the proceeds would fund projects that would steer the state away from fossil fuels.
 In 2015, BG Group, BP, Eni, Royal Dutch Shell, Statoil, and Total sent an open letter to the UNFCCC calling for carbon pricing and eventually link it into a global system.
 A 2019 International Monetary Fund report stated that "a global tax of $75 per ton by the year 2030 could limit the planet's warming to 2 degrees Celsius."
 CEOs supporting carbon taxes include Fred Smith (FedEx); James Owens (Caterpillar), Paul Anderson (Duke Energy), Elon Musk (Tesla and SpaceX).
 Companies include Unilever and Nestlé

Alternatives
As of 2015, developing countries were responsible for 63% of carbon emissions. Various barriers stand in the way of developing countries from adopting plans to slow carbon emissions, including a carbon tax. Developing countries often prioritize economic growth over lower emissions. Nuclear power is under development in multiple countries as an emissions-free energy source.

Wind energy and solar energy are other alternatives to fossil fuels. Wind turbines are a sustainable and renewable source of power.

Emission trading

Cap and trade is another approach. Emission levels are limited and emission permits traded among emitters. The permits can be issued via government auctions or by offered without charge based on existing emissions (grandfathering). Auctions raise revenues that can be used to reduce other taxes or to fund government programs. Variations include setting price-floor and/or price-ceiling for permits. A carbon tax can combined with trading.

A cap with grandfathered permits can have an efficiency advantage since it applies to all industries. Cap and trade provides an equal incentive for all producers at the margin to reduce their emissions. This is an advantage over a tax that exempts or has reduced rates for certain sectors.

Both carbon taxes and trading systems aim to reduce emissions by creating a price for emitting . When the environmental damage and therefore the appropriate tax of each unit of  cannot be accurately calculated, a permit system may be more advantageous. In the case of uncertainty regarding the costs of  abatement for firms, a tax is preferable.

Permit systems regulate total emissions. In practice the limit has often been set so high that permit prices are not significant. In the first phase of the European Union Emissions Trading System, firms reduced their emissions to their allotted quantity without the purchase of any additional permits. This drove permit prices to nearly zero two years later, crashing the system and requiring reforms that would eventually appear in EUETS Phase 3.

The distinction between carbon taxes and permit systems can get blurred when hybrid systems are allowed.  A hybrid sets limits on price movements, potentially softening the cap.  When the price gets too high, the issuing authority issues additional permits at that price.  A price floor may be breached when emissions are so low that no one needs to buy a permit. Economist Gilbert Metcalf has proposed such a system, the Emissions Assurance Mechanism, and the idea, in principle, has been adopted by the Climate Leadership Council.

Views 
A 2018 survey of leading economists found that 58% of the surveyed economists agreed with the assertion, "Carbon taxes are a better way to implement climate policy than cap-and-trade," 31% stated that they had no opinion or that it was uncertain, but none of the respondents disagreed.

In a review study Fisher et al. concluded that the choice between an international quota (cap) system, or an international carbon tax, remained ambiguous. Lu et al. (2012) compared a carbon tax, emissions trading, and command-and-control regulation at the industry level, concluding that market-based mechanisms would perform better than emission standards in achieving emission targets without affecting industrial production.

James E. Hansen argued in Storms of My Grandchildren and in an open letter to then President Barack Obama that emissions trading would only make money for banks and hedge funds and allow 'business-as-usual' for the chief carbon-emitting industries.

See also 

 4 Degrees and Beyond International Climate Conference
 Economics of global warming
 Cap and Share
 Carbon credit
 Carbon offset
 Congestion pricing
 Emissions Reduction Currency System
 Environmental economics
 Environmental impact of aviation
 Hypermobility (travel)
 Landfill Tax Credit Scheme (in the UK)
 Meat tax
 Pigou Club
 Polluter pays principle
 Tax horsepower

References 
Notes

Citations

Further reading 
 
 
 
 

Environmental tax
Environmental law
Carbon finance
Low-carbon economy